Avraham Shani Schneiderovitz (1 December 1916 – 25 June 2001) was an Israeli footballer who played as a forward for Maccabi Tel Aviv and Maccabi Nes Tziona at club level, and the Mandatory Palestine national team internationally.

Schneiderovitz took part in Mandatory Palestine's last international match against Lebanon in 1940, scoring one goal; it was his only international cap.

References

External links

 Avraham Schneiderovitz at maccabipedia.co.il
 

1916 births
2001 deaths
Jewish Israeli sportspeople
Association football inside forwards
Association football forwards
Mandatory Palestine footballers
Israeli footballers
Mandatory Palestine international footballers
Maccabi Nes Tziona F.C. players
Maccabi Tel Aviv F.C. players